DelGrosso's Park is a family-oriented amusement park located in Tipton, Pennsylvania, a northern suburb of Altoona, Pennsylvania. The park was purchased by the DelGrosso family in 1946 and was named "Bland's Park" until 2000. In 2000, the DelGrosso family decided to change its name to "DelGrosso's Amusement Park." The park hosts picnics and special music events in its pavilion/picnic area.

History

Formerly known as Bland's Park until 2000, the small family-friendly amusement park is located in Tipton, in Blair County, Pennsylvania. Altoona railroad businessman, Fred DelGrosso, purchased the amusement park in 1946.

DelGrosso's Park was originally opened by the Rinard brothers on the Blands' family farm in 1907. It was purchased in 1946 by Fred DelGrosso, at which time the park was home to a number of rides installed by the Rinard's including the current Carouselle. Since purchasing the park, the DelGrosso family has continued to invest in the park with various ride and attractions such as a waterpark addition in 1997 and expansion in 1999 and 2016.

The DelGrosso family is also the founder of DelGrosso Foods, Inc. DelGrosso Foods produces and distributes pizza sauce, spaghetti sauce, spaghetti noodles, and other Italian specialty items.

The current park

The park includes more than 30 rides and an adjacent Italian themed waterpark, Laguna Splash, that opened in 2016. The park resides on both sides of Old Route 220 with Laguna Splash and parking on the southeast side of the road, while park-side resides on the northwest side of the road.

Roller coasters
After the 2003 season, the park sold its Pinfari "Zyklon" roller coaster, installed in 1987, to Blue Diamond Park (which closed In 2008). This coaster replaced a smaller steel mini-coaster known for jumping the track every third lap. A Reverchon "Crazy Mouse" was installed in its place in 2004. In the same year, a Fajume "Wacky Worm" kiddie coaster was added to the park.

In 2006, the park purchased the "Revolution," an Arrow Dynamics loop and corkscrew, from Libertyland for US$55,000 at auction. The coaster has since been purchased by Gloria's Fantasyland in the Philippines and is no longer on site as of June 2019.

Rides

Current Roller coasters

Thrill Rides

Family Rides

Kids Kingdom

Past Rides
 Zyklon
 Little Dipper
 Sky Fighter
 Roto Whip
 Two Bumper Car Rides
 Calypso
 Flying Scooters
 Sea Dragon
 Balloon Race
 Ferris Wheel
 Red Baron
 Space Odyssey
 Flying Bobs
 Music Express

Laguna Splash Waterpark

 Laguna  Waterworks (Formerly known as Tipton Waterworks 1997–2015):
A water-play structure opened in 1997 as the first part of the water-park, showcasing small slides and a tipping-bucket

 Laguna Slides (Formerly known as Tipton Rapids 1999–2015):
A water slide complex opened in 1999 with five slides on two towers 
called the Red Tower and Green Tower.

Red Tower
 Midnight Express:
A mostly enclosed slide. It is the only enclosed slide of the five.
 Great White:
A wide "double-dip" slide that usually makes the passenger's rafts going down spin.
 Gravity Groove:
A slide that has a hair-pin curve and a dip and an uphill section. Riders must weigh 140 lbs. combined to ride so they can make it over the hill.

Green Tower
 Twin Twisters:
Two identical slides that are the tallest of the slides. On the slide, you race the person on the other Twister slide on a toboggan-style mat.

Wave Oceano
Opened in 2016, a large, six-foot-deep Wave pool at the far end of the water park

River Lazio
Opened in 2016, a winding Lazy river attraction that offers both a relaxing and wild experience

Bambini Cove
Opened in 2016, a children's activity pool featuring a gondola slide, a small splash pad, and the water park's centerpiece, a scale model of the Leaning Tower of Pisa.

References

External links
 DelGrosso's Web Site

 ThrillNetwork.com's Listing
 DelGrosso Foods, Inc.

Amusement parks in Pennsylvania
Buildings and structures in Blair County, Pennsylvania
Tourist attractions in Blair County, Pennsylvania
1909 establishments in Pennsylvania